Reliques may refer to:

 Jacobite Reliques (1817), a collection of Jacobite protest songs
 Reliques of Ancient English Poetry (1765), a collection of ballads and popular songs
 Reliques of Father Prout (1836), by Francis Sylvester Mahony

See also

 Relics, items related to a saint or venerated person
 Reliquary, is a container for relics
 Relique or Piano Sonata in C major D. 840 (1825), by Franz Schubert